The Texas Federation of Women's Clubs Headquarters, now referred to as simply "The Mansion," or "The Fed," is a Georgian Revival mansion located on the southwest corner of 24th Street and San Gabriel Street in Austin, Texas, United States. The building was completed in 1931 to be the headquarters for the Texas Federation of Women's Clubs, with assistance from local philanthropist Clara Driscoll. It was designed by Dallas architect Henry Coke Knight.

The building sits adjacent to the historic Neill-Cochran House (1855) and is a prominent feature of the Judge's Hill neighborhood, to the west of the University of Texas.

The Mansion was added to the National Register of Historic Places on October 24, 1985. It is one of the best remaining examples of Georgian Revival architecture in Texas. Today it is mostly used to host weddings and receptions, though every Thursday night since 1999 the Austin Swing Syndicate holds a swing dance on the  sprung polished oak floors of the Texas Federation of Women's Clubs Headquarters.

References

National Register of Historic Places in Austin, Texas
Georgian Revival architecture in Texas
Headquarters in the United States
Women's club buildings in Texas
Clubhouses on the National Register of Historic Places in Texas
History of women in Texas
Recorded Texas Historic Landmarks
City of Austin Historic Landmarks